Bryce Everett Brentz  (born December 30, 1988) is an American professional baseball left fielder who is a free agent. He has played in Major League Baseball (MLB) for the Boston Red Sox. During the 2014 and 2016 seasons, he appeared in a total of 34 MLB games with Boston.

Amateur career
Brentz attended South-Doyle High School in Knoxville, Tennessee. He then enrolled at Middle Tennessee State University, where he played college baseball for the Middle Tennessee Blue Raiders as a pitcher and an outfielder. He was a consensus All-American in 2009.

Professional career

Boston Red Sox
Brentz was drafted by the Boston Red Sox in the first round of the 2010 Major League Baseball Draft.

Entering 2013, Brentz was ranked as the sixth best prospect in the Red Sox minor league system.  He was preparing to participate in spring training of 2013 until he accidentally shot himself in the leg while cleaning his handgun during the offseason. Brentz returned to the Pawtucket Red Sox of the Triple-A International League, but missed time in July and August due to a torn meniscus. He posted a .262 average with 19 home runs and 64 RBIs in 88 games between Pawtucket and the Gulf Coast Red Sox, where he completed a rehab assignment, while tying with David Chester for the most home runs in the system.

Brentz was added to the Red Sox' 40-man roster on November 20, 2013. He played for Pawtucket in 2014 and was part of the team that won the International League Governors' Cup. After Pawtucket lost the one-game Triple-A World Series to the Omaha Storm Chasers of the Pacific Coast League, the Red Sox promoted Brentz to the major leagues, and he made his major league debut on September 17. He recorded a double off Pittsburgh Pirates pitcher Francisco Liriano in his first game for his first Major League hit.

In 2015, Brentz missed time from May 20 through August 2 with a right hamstring strain. In 59 games with the PawSox that year, he hit .232 with 8 HR and 26 RBI. In 2016, Brentz missed the beginning of the season, from April 6 to May 6, with an oblique injury. In 54 games with Pawtucket and 12 games of rehab for the Portland Sea Dogs, he hit a combined .242 with 5 HR and 24 RBI. He also had a stint with the Red Sox that year, hitting .279 with 1 HR and 7 RBI in 25 games. Brentz hit his first MLB home run on June 26, 2016, off Rangers pitcher Martin Pérez.

On March 31, 2017, Brentz was outrighted off Boston's 40-man roster, and he accepted the assignment to Pawtucket. He is out of options. He was named International League Player of the Week for the week of June 18. He was also named an IL Mid-Season All-Star and a Triple-A Home Run Derby participant. Brentz, who hit a total of 38 home runs in the derby, defeated Dan Vogelbach in the final round to win the derby title. On November 2, 2017, Brentz had his contract purchased from Triple-A.

New York Mets
On February 20, 2018, Brentz was traded to the Pittsburgh Pirates in exchange for cash considerations. He was placed on outright waivers on March 24. He did not play for the Pirates organization, as on March 26, he was claimed off waivers by the New York Mets, and was outrighted to Triple-A on March 28. Overall during 2018, Brentz batted .263 in 57 minor league games. He declared free agency on October 5.

Return to Boston
On December 23, 2018, Brentz signed a minor league deal to return to the Red Sox, and was assigned to Triple-A Pawtucket. He appeared in 95 games with Pawtucket during the 2019 season, batting .216 with 18 home runs and 50 RBIs.

Somerset Patriots
On January 31, 2020, Brentz signed with the Somerset Patriots of the Atlantic League of Professional Baseball. He did not play a game for the team due to the cancellation of the ALPB season because of the COVID-19 pandemic and became a free agent after the season.

Kane County Cougars
On November 17, 2021, Brentz signed with the Kane County Cougars of the American Association of Professional Baseball. Brentz played 7 games for the Cougars, during which he hit .222 with 1 Home Run and 1 RBI. On July 31, 2022, Brentz was released by the Cougars.

References

External links

1988 births
Baseball players from Knoxville, Tennessee
Boston Red Sox players
Greenville Drive players
Gulf Coast Red Sox players
Leones del Escogido players
American expatriate baseball players in the Dominican Republic
Living people
Lowell Spinners players
Major League Baseball left fielders
Middle Tennessee Blue Raiders baseball players
Naranjeros de Hermosillo players
American expatriate baseball players in Mexico
Pawtucket Red Sox players
Portland Sea Dogs players
Salem Red Sox players
Surprise Saguaros players
Criollos de Caguas players
All-American college baseball players
Liga de Béisbol Profesional Roberto Clemente outfielders